Denis Sullivan may refer to:

 Denis Sullivan (schooner), a schooner from Milwaukee, Wisconsin
 Denis Sullivan (shipbuilder) (died 1916), Australian shipbuilder
 Denis Sullivan, sued Kevin Delaney, publisher of the controversial Sark Newspaper, for defamation

See also
Dennis Sullivan (disambiguation)